John Thomson may refer to:

Entertainment
 John Thomson of Duddingston (1778–1840), Scottish minister and landscape artist
 John Thomson (composer) (1805–1841), Scottish composer
 John Thomson (photographer) (1837–1921), Scottish photographer
 John Stuart Thomson (1869–1950), American author
 John Thomson (comedian) (born 1969), English comedian and actor
 John J. Thomson, production sound mixer

Politics
John Thomson (MP) (1521–1597), MP for New Windsor and Bedfordshire
John Charles Thomson (1866–1934), New Zealand politician
John Thomson (Ohio politician) (1780–1852), U.S. Congressman from Ohio
John Renshaw Thomson (1800–1862), U.S. Senator from New Jersey
John Thomson (Australian politician) (1862–1934), Nationalist member of the House of Representatives
John Thomson (Western Australian politician), Nationalist Member of the Western Australian Legislative Assembly, 1921–1924
 John Thomson (diplomat) (1927–2018), British high commissioner to India and ambassador to the UN
John William Thomson (born 1928), member of the Canadian Parliament
 John Bryce Thomson (1840–1911), mayor of Dunedin, New Zealand

Religion
 John Thomson (Presbyterian minister) (1690–1753), Irish-born Presbyterian minister in Philadelphia
 John Thomson (bishop) (born 1959), Church of England Bishop of Selby
 John Thomson, minister in Sutherland, Scotland who was responsible for recording the works of the poet Rob Donn

Science
 John Thomson (physician) (1765–1846), Scottish surgeon and physician
 John Thomson (cartographer) (1777–1840), Scottish cartographer
 John Turnbull Thomson (1821–1884), English civil engineer
 John Millar Thomson (1849–1933), British chemist
 Arthur Thomson (naturalist) (John Arthur Thomson, 1861–1933), Scottish naturalist
 John Walter Thomson (1913–2009), Scottish-American lichenologist

Sports
Jock Thomson (John Ross Thomson, 1906–1979), Scottish football player (Dundee FC, Everton FC) and manager (Manchester City FC)
John Thomson (footballer, born 1896) (1896–1980), Scottish football goalkeeper (Brentford FC, Plymouth Argyle)
John Thomson (footballer, born 1909) (1909–1931), Scottish football goalkeeper (Celtic FC, Scotland)
 John Thomson (footballer, born 1915) (1915–1944), Scottish footballer (Hamilton Academical FC)
John Thomson (swimmer) (1903–?), British freestyle swimmer who competed in the 1924 Summer Olympics
Johnny Thomson (1922–1960), American race car driver
John Thomson (baseball) (born 1973), American baseball player
John Thomson (bowls), Welsh international lawn bowls player

Other
 John Edgar Thomson (1808–1874), American civil engineer, railroad executive and industrialist
 John Thomson (librarian) (1835–1916), American librarian
 John Bell Thomson (1835–1896), New Zealand police officer and detective
 John Sen Inches Thomson (1845–1933), Scottish whaler and sealer, ship owner, captain and author
 John Thomson (banker) (1908–1998), British banker
 John Thomson (RAF officer) (1941–1994), one of the senior officers of the Royal Air Force, later Commander-in-Chief Strike Command
 John Thomson (fraudster), warehouse keeper of the Charitable Corporation
 John Thomson (Australian businessman) (1887–1960)
 John Deas Thomson (1760s–1838), British Navy administrator
 John Thomson (died 1998), Deputy Steward of Oxford University and Lord Lieutenant of Oxfordshire

See also
Jack Thomson (disambiguation)
John Thompson (disambiguation)
Jon Thomson (born 1969), British artist
John Thomson Ford (1829–1894), American theater manager